Nazanin Daneshvar (born in 1983, Tehran) is an Iranian Internet entrepreneur who founded and is now running the discount site Takhfifan. She is unusual as a woman establishing a company in Iran and she has attracted some attention. In 2019, she became one of UNCTAD's "eTrade for Women Advocates" from the developing world.

Life
Daneshvar was born in Tehran in 1983 and she went to grad school in Tehran. After that, she worked in London assisting a startup trying to break into the Iranian market.

When Daneshvar started Takhfifan, she was on her own as there were no other female website entrepreneurs she could compete against. She faced a lot of poor judgment from potential business contacts and she had to take her father along for the first year to show some gravitas as they would not believe that she was in charge. The company is very similar to Groupon but her company operates in Iran. The site offers large discounts to potential buyers and then passes on discounts offered by the suppliers. Despite her difficulties, she believes that Iran is improving and she has encouraged other Iranian emigrants to return to Iran and help it improve further.

In 2017, she was invited to speak at the fourth annual Global Female Leaders Summit in Berlin where she explained the challenges that she has faced. She went on to lead a discussion about cultural glass ceilings and the possibilities and opportunities facing women managers in Iran. One of the advantages of Iran at the moment is the sanctions created by other countries that limit imports and exports. With these sanctions in place then it creates a hothouse for establishing local versions of other sites. She demonstrates her confidence by mentoring other women using the ten years of experience she has gained in e-commerce.

In September 2019, the United Nations Conference on Trade and Development announced seven "eTrade for Women Advocates" from the developing world. Daneshvar was named and the others were Clarisse Iribagiza, Nina Angelovska, Xiaofei Yao, Patricia Zoundi Yao, Claudia de Heredia, and Helianti Hilman. The awards were was announced on the periphery of the United Nations General Assembly in New York but Daneshvar and Clarisse Iribagiza from Rwanda did not attend the award ceremony.

References

1983 births
Living people
Businesspeople from Tehran
Computer scientists